Flatwood is an unincorporated community in Adair County, Kentucky, United States.  Its elevation is 784 feet. There is an Old African-American School built in the 1920s behind Santa Fe Baptist Church. The school was built by the CEO of Sears and Robuck's(239 m).

References

Unincorporated communities in Adair County, Kentucky
Unincorporated communities in Kentucky